The 1986 Hong Kong Masters was a professional non-ranking snooker tournament that took place between 2 and 7 September 1986 at the Queen Elizabeth Stadium in Hong Kong.  Willie Thorne won the tournament, defeating Dennis Taylor 8–3 in the final. Thorne recorded two  breaks, 102 and 106, during the final. The event was sponsored by Camus and had a prize fund of £86,000.

Main draw
First round and quarter-finals source: Hayton and Dee (2004); Semi-finals and final source: Hale (1987)

References

1986 in snooker
1986 in Hong Kong sport
Sport in Hong Kong